Shark cage diving is underwater diving or snorkeling where the observer remains inside a protective cage designed to prevent sharks from making contact with the divers. Shark cage diving is used for scientific observation, underwater cinematography, and as a tourist activity. Sharks may be attracted to the vicinity of the cage by the use of bait, in a procedure known as chumming, which has attracted some controversy as it is claimed to potentially alter the natural behaviour of sharks in the vicinity of swimmers.

Similar cages are also used purely as a protective measure for divers working in waters where potentially dangerous shark species are known to be present. In this application the shark-proof cage may be used as a refuge, or as a diving stage during descent and ascent, particularly during staged decompression where the divers may be vulnerable while constrained to a specific depth in mid-water for several minutes. In other applications a mobile cage may be carried by the diver while harvesting organisms such as abalone.

Shark-proof cage 

A shark-proof cage is a metal cage used by an underwater diver to observe dangerous types of sharks up close in relative safety. This can include various species of shark, but the most commonly observed within the confines of a cage are  the great white shark and the bull shark, which are both known to be aggressive at times. Shark-proof cages are built to withstand being rammed and bitten by sharks, and are intended to protect the user from potential injury. Cages can provide a visual and tactile deterrent to sharks. Cage-diving allows people to closely monitor sharks for scientific, commercial or recreational purposes, and sometimes interact with them.

The shark-proof cage is also used in the controversial exercise of shark baiting, where tourists are lowered in a cage while the tour guides bait the water to attract sharks or stimulate certain behavior.

Early development 
Shark cages were first developed by Jacques Cousteau. Cousteau used a shark cage during the production of The Silent World which was released in 1956. Rodney Fox developed his own shark cage in the 1960s. Fox's first design was inspired by a visit to a zoo he made after surviving a near-fatal shark attack in 1963. Later designs were refined further and put to use by documentary filmmakers and abalone fishers who sought personal protection from great white sharks. Peter Gimbel was one filmmaker involved in the design of a shark-proof cage which was used during the production of Blue water, white death (1971).

Self propelled version 
On September 4, 1979,  US patent number 4166462  was issued for a self-propelled shark-proof cage; being designed to allow abalone divers to collect abalone without becoming vulnerable to attack. Thanks to the propulsion system, abalone divers would exert themselves less and, therefore, be able to collect their prey for longer periods of time. The patent abstract details a self-propelled cage with at least one access opening and a mounting frame that carries both an air motor and a propeller. Buoyant material is attached to the frame so that the cage may be made neutrally buoyant. This patent expired on September 4, 1996.

Shark cage diving tourism 
During the 2000s, shark cage diving become increasingly popular as a tourist activity. In South Australia, tourists are taken by boat from Port Lincoln to the Neptune Islands in southern Spencer Gulf where they view great white sharks either from a cage tethered to the back of a boat near the surface, or from a cage lowered to the seabed. The government considers the activity to be one of South Australia's “iconic nature-based tourism experiences” which supports 70 jobs and contributes over $11 million to the state's economy. Shark cage diving is popular in the Guadalupe Island Biosphere Reserve in the Pacific Ocean off Baja California..

Shark baiting 
Shark baiting is a procedure where the water is baited by chumming with fish or other materials attractive to sharks. Tourists remain inside a shark-proof cage while tour guides bait the waters to attract sharks for the tourists to observe. There have been claims that this could lead to potentially aggressive behavior by the shark population. Some conservation groups, scuba divers, and underwater photographers consider the practice undesirable and potentially dangerous.

In South Australia, abalone divers have been attacked by great white sharks, and divers believe that great white shark cage diving tourism has altered shark behavior including making them more inclined to approach boats. At least one abalone diver, Peter Stephenson has called for a ban on shark-cage diving and described it as a "major workplace safety issue”. The government of South Australia claims that there is "no scientific evidence" to suggest that the general public is at elevated risk of shark attack as a result of shark cage tourism.

Opponents of the cage-diving industry, such as shark-survivor Craig Bovim, who was reportedly bitten by a ragged-tooth shark (a species not targeted by cage diving operators in the region, and not generally considered a hazard to divers) while snorkeling for lobster at Scarborough, on the other side of the Cape Peninsula from Seal Island, where the shark cage boats operate, believe that the repeated chumming used to lure sharks to tourist cages may alter sharks' behaviour.
 Bovim's opponents, such as marine environmentalist Wilfred Chivell, contend that there is no demonstrated correlation between shark-baiting and shark attacks against humans. However, there is evidence that the baiting of sharks for tourism does alter the patterns of movement of Great White Sharks.

Shark cage diving incidents 
In 2005, a British tourist, Mark Currie, was exposed to a high risk of injury or death when a  great white shark bit through the bars of a shark cage being used during a recreational shark dive off the coast of South Africa. The shark circled the boat several times, and began to attack the side of the cage, then started to crush and bite through. The captain attempted to free the cage by trying to distract the shark. He did this by hitting it on the head with an iron pole. The shark bit into one of the buoys at the top of the cage, which caused the cage to begin sinking. Currie quickly swam out of the top of the cage and was pulled to safety by the boat's captain, who fended off the shark with blows to its head.

In 2007, a commercial shark cage was destroyed off the coast of Guadalupe Island after a  great white shark became entangled and tore the cage apart in a frantic effort to free itself. Tourists captured video of the incident, which quickly spread throughout the Internet.

On April 13, 2008, there was a fatal shark cage diving capsize off the coast of Gansbaai, South Africa where three tourists died - Two Americans and one Norwegian. The cage diving vessel was anchored near the Geldsteen Reef and engaged in shark cage diving viewing activities when the vessel was capsized by a large 6+ meter wave. The boat engine was off while anchored over the reef in rolling 4+ meter swells, and the skipper was not behind the wheel monitoring the weather and increasing waves when the boat capsized. Instead, the skipper was at the back of the vessel handling the bait line attracting sharks towards the shark cage. The videographer was still in the cage at the time of capsize filming additional underwater camera footage for the DVDs sold as a tour souvenir. After the capsize occurred, all 19 passengers were thrown overboard. There wasn’t a passenger manifest on board the vessel, down at the harbor, or in the cage diving operator’s business office. Therefore, it was unknown at the time how many people were on board. As a result, three tourists were trapped underneath the capsized hull for more than forty minutes before it was realized that passengers were missing and still unaccounted for. It was shown during the 2014 Western Cape High Court Trial in Cape Town, South Africa that the wave that capsized the vessel was not a freak wave, and simply a larger wave in a 4+ meter rolling swell. Since the vessel was anchored over a reef with engines off, and no one behind the wheel operating the vessel, it made a capsize even more probable. There were other breaking waves shown in photos and videos which showed the increasing danger and risk for all passengers on the vessel. The 2014 Trial Judge ruled that the skipper, dive operators and boat owners were  found guilty on more than thirty charges of negligence. Shark cage diving activities were ruled as one of the primary reasons for the capsize and death of three tourists. The dive operators were still actively engaged in cage diving viewing activities at the time of the capsize. There was no other reason for the vessel to have remained anchored in that precise location over a shallow reef, with engines off, despite increasing swells and breaking waves, if sharks had not present and if the videographer was not still in the shark cage filming additional footage.  

Another incident reported in 2016 occurred off the coast of Mexico, when a shark that lunged for the bait broke into the cage and the diver was able to escape uninjured.

See also 
 Shark Shield
 Shark net
 Extreme sport

Further reading 

 Aich, Raj Sekhar (2022). Iridescent Skin : A Multispecies Journey of White sharks and Caged Humans. Niyogi Books. .

References 

Shark attack prevention
Diving equipment
Sharks
Safety equipment